Sahibzada Muzammil-ur-Rashid Abbasi (born 25 June 1961) is a Pakistani politician who was a member of the Provincial Assembly of the Punjab from 2002 to 2007 as well as a member of the royal family of Bahawalpur State.

References

Living people
1961 births
Pakistan Muslim League (Q) MPAs (Punjab)
Bahawalpur royal family
Punjab MPAs 2002–2007
People from Bahawalpur